Valery Vladimirovich Zakharevich (born 14 September 1967) is  a Russian fencer, who won two Olympic medals in the team épée competition: the bronze medal at the 1992 Summer Olympics in Barcelona and silver medal  at the 1996 Summer Olympics in Atlanta. He was born in Uzbekistan. He was affiliated with CSKA Samara.

References

1967 births
Living people
People from Tashkent Region
Soviet male fencers
Russian male fencers
Fencers at the 1992 Summer Olympics
Fencers at the 1996 Summer Olympics
Olympic fencers of the Unified Team
Olympic fencers of Russia
Olympic bronze medalists for the Unified Team
Olympic silver medalists for Russia
Olympic medalists in fencing
Medalists at the 1992 Summer Olympics
Medalists at the 1996 Summer Olympics
Honoured Masters of Sport of the USSR
Armed Forces sports society athletes